Flylo  may refer to:

 A fictional airline in the TV show Come Fly With Me.
 American rapper Flying Lotus
 Greek rapper FLY LO